In July 2016, the International Union for Conservation of Nature (IUCN) listed 608 vulnerable insect species. Of all evaluated insect species, 10% are listed as vulnerable. 
The IUCN also lists 15 insect subspecies as vulnerable.

No subpopulations of insects have been evaluated by the IUCN.

For a species to be assessed as vulnerable to extinction the best available evidence must meet quantitative criteria set by the IUCN designed to reflect "a high risk of extinction in the wild". Endangered and critically endangered species also meet the quantitative criteria of vulnerable species, and are listed separately. See: List of endangered insects, List of critically endangered insects. Vulnerable, endangered and critically endangered species are collectively referred to as threatened species by the IUCN.

Additionally 1702 insect species (28% of those evaluated) are listed as data deficient, meaning there is insufficient information for a full assessment of conservation status. As these species typically have small distributions and/or populations, they are intrinsically likely to be threatened, according to the IUCN. While the category of data deficient indicates that no assessment of extinction risk has been made for the taxa, the IUCN notes that it may be appropriate to give them "the same degree of attention as threatened taxa, at least until their status can be assessed".

This is a complete list of vulnerable insect species and subspecies as evaluated by the IUCN.

Coleoptera
There are 50 beetle species assessed as vulnerable.

Dytiscids

Longhorn beetles

Scarabaeids

Other beetle species

Diptera

Hymenoptera
There are 155 species in the order Hymenoptera assessed as vulnerable.

Ants

Colletids

Melittids
Melitta hispanica
Melitta kastiliensis

Apids

Megachilids
Wallace's giant bee (Megachile pluto)

Lepidoptera
Lepidoptera comprises moths and butterflies. There are 128 species and ten subspecies in the order Lepidoptera assessed as vulnerable.

Lasiocampids
Small lappet moth (Phyllodesma ilicifolia)

Swallowtail butterflies

Lycaenids

Nymphalids
Species

Subspecies

Skippers
Dakota skipper (Hesperia dacotae)
Cinquefoil skipper (Pyrgus cirsii)

Pierids

Mantodea

Notoptera
Mount St Helens' grylloblattid (Grylloblatta chirurgica)

Odonata
Odonata includes dragonflies and damselflies. There are 129 species and five subspecies in the order Odonata assessed as vulnerable.

Chlorogomphids

Chlorocyphids

Platycnemidids

Megapodagrionids

Gomphids
Species

Subspecies
Erpetogomphus lampropeltis lampropeltis

Coenagrionids
Species

Subspecies

Aeshnids

Libellulids

Other Odonata species

Orthoptera
There are 137 species in the order Orthoptera assessed as vulnerable.

Crickets

Acridids

Stenopelmatids

Tettigoniids

Rhaphidophorids

Phaneropterids

Other Orthoptera species

Phasmatodea
Peppermint stick insect (Megacrania batesii)

Plecoptera
Otway stonefly (Eusthenia nothofagi)
Mount Kosciusko wingless stonefly (Leptoperla cacuminis)

See also
 Lists of IUCN Red List vulnerable species
 List of least concern insects
 List of near threatened insects
 List of endangered insects
 List of critically endangered insects
 List of recently extinct insects
 List of data deficient insects

References

Insects
Vulnerable insects
Vulnerable insects
Vulnerable insects